"We Love You" is a song by the English rock band the Rolling Stones that was written by Mick Jagger and Keith Richards. Their first new release of the summer of 1967, it was first released as a single on 18 August in the United Kingdom, with "Dandelion" as the B-side. The song peaked at number eight in Britain and number 50 in the United States, where "Dandelion" was promoted as the A-side and peaked at number 14. 

Written as a message of gratitude to their fans for the public support towards them during the drug arrests of Jagger and Richards, the recording features guest backing vocals by John Lennon and Paul McCartney of the Beatles. It is considered one of the Rolling Stones' most experimental songs, featuring sound effects, layers of vocal overdubs, and a prominent Mellotron part played by Brian Jones. The single's two tracks were the final new Stones recordings for which a production credit was given for band manager Andrew Loog Oldham. The recording sessions that produced "We Love You" and "Dandelion" represented Oldham's last work with the band before resigning as their producer over personal and professional conflicts with them.

Critics at the time of its release praised the song for its production and vocal and instrumental performances, while also noting its significance to the band's current status. However, some at the time viewed the song as somewhat overproduced. Retrospective reviews have been more mixed, with some describing its sound as too similar to the Beatles, and emblematic of the band losing its identity over the Summer of Love in favor of following trends. However, others praise the song as a unique offering to the genre of psychedelic music, and for its diverse range of musical influences.

Background
By the late 1960s, drugs were common in the British music industry, although this fact was not commonly known by much of the public. In 1966, the ITV documentary A Boy Called Donovan publicised Donovan's use of marijuana to the wider world, marking one of the first times a musician's drug use had become so publicly known. Donovan later described how "this was the first time a British television audience had caught a glimpse of the lifestyle of the beatniks and many were shocked". In early 1967, Jagger, Richards and Jones began to be hounded by authorities over their recreational drug use, after the News of the World ran a three-part feature entitled "Pop Stars and Drugs: Facts That Will Shock You". The series described alleged LSD parties hosted by the Moody Blues attended by top stars including the Who's Pete Townshend and Cream's Ginger Baker, and alleged admissions of drug use by leading pop musicians. The first article targeted Donovan, who as a result was raided soon after, the second article (published on 5 February) targeted the Rolling Stones. 

In February 1967, two members of The Rolling Stones, lead singer Mick Jagger and guitarist Keith Richards were arrested at Richards' home, Redlands, West Wittering, Sussex for drug possession. By this point, Jagger had begun suing News of the World for libel over their article on the Rolling Stones' drug use. Although both Jagger and Richards were convicted following the raid, a publicity campaign by their colleagues in the music industry encouraged popular support and criticism of the decision to prosecute them. Most notably, the traditionally conservatively oriented newspaper The Times published an op-ed by William Rees-Mogg asking Who Breaks a Butterfly on a Wheel?, in which he criticised the prosecutions as unfounded and unnecessary. Additionally, the Who recorded cover versions of Stones songs "Under My Thumb" and "The Last Time" as a show of solidarity with the Stones throughout the trials.

"We Love You" was written in the aftermath of the drug arrest and the public outrage that followed it. The song opens with the sounds of entry into jail, and a cell door clanging shut before the main mellotron riff as played by Brian Jones enters. The song's lyrics appear to be "a spoof" of the Lennon–McCartney song "All You Need Is Love", which the Beatles performed on the Our World satellite broadcast on 25 June. Alternatively, as Lennon insisted was the case, in his famous 1970 Rolling Stone interview, the lyrics can be seen as echoing the message of the Beatles song, on which Jagger and Richards were among the many chorus singers. Many commentators have suggested in light of the context surrounding its creation "We Love You" espouses a strong anti-establishment stance, with notable lyrics including "we don't care if you hound we and lock the doors around we" and "you will never win we, your uniforms don't fit we."

Recording and composition
The Stones recorded "We Love You" during the sessions for Their Satanic Majesties Request at Olympic Studios during July 1967. In contrast to the single's flip side "Dandelion", which largely features baroque instrumentation and influences, "We Love You" is largely inspired by the burgeoning psychedelic genre, and by music of the Arab world. Outwardly, it was an anthem of defiance, and a message from the band to their fans and those who had defended them, expressing appreciation for support in the wake of their recent drug busts. Yet it was also critical of the police and the institutions that had spent the past few months harassing them and showcased the Stones' true feelings about this (as is represented by Jones' surreal Mellotron playing). "We Love You" is a psychedelic collage of jail sounds, Nicky Hopkins' foreboding piano riff, and otherworldly tape-delayed vocal effects, featuring a visiting John Lennon and Paul McCartney on high harmonies. Studio engineer George Chkiantz said that even though there was a delay between hitting the note and the sound coming out of the Mellotron, Jones managed to overcome this challenge and get "a tight rhythmic punch" out of the instrument for the track.

Mick Jagger was quoted at the time as saying that "We Love You" was "just a bit of fun". The original single releases had a faded-in coda consisting of a short, distorted section of vocals from the B-side, "Dandelion". The same effect, fading in a portion of "We Love You", was used at the beginning of "Dandelion". Musicologist Walter Everett identifies this feature as a response to the Beatles' use of a fade-out/fade-in ending to close their February 1967 single "Strawberry Fields Forever". This coda has generally been absent from reissues of the song on compilation albums by the Stones such as Through the Past, Darkly (Big Hits Vol. 2) and GRRR!. Similarly, "Dandelion" has also been traditionally abridged in this way on compilations that feature it. However, the 1989 release Singles Collection: The London Years features unabridged versions of both songs.

Promotional film
The promotional film for the single was directed by Peter Whitehead. It included footage from recording sessions along with segments that re-enacted the 1895 trial of Oscar Wilde, with Jagger, Richards and Marianne Faithfull respectively portraying Wilde, Marquess of Queensberry, and Lord Alfred Douglas. Footage also appears of Brian Jones, apparently high on drugs with his eyes drooping and unfocused.

The producer of Top of the Pops refused to show the film on that programme. A BBC spokesman said the producer did not think it was suitable for the type of audience who watched Top of the Pops. He went on to say there was not a ban on it by the BBC, it was simply this producer's decision.

In 2022, the promotional film for "We Love You" was remastered in 4k resolution and released online for the first time.

Critical reception
Among contemporary reviews of the single, Chris Welch of Melody Maker described the song as "considerably too much", and said that "The Stones and their highly recognisable friends chant the message while what sounds like mellotron, piano, drums and cymbals move to a monstrous, majestic climax like a soul Ravel." In the NME, Keith Altham identified "Dandelion" as the more "immediate" of the two sides. He described "We Love You" as "a musical-mindjammer with everything going like the clappers... to provide that special kind of ugly-excitement in sound which is the Rolling Stones speciality", and he concluded: "The basic idea of the song is as simple as 'All You Need Is Love' but the musical holocaust surrounding it is so cleverly produced you will be able to listen to it again and again and still find new ideas." Cash Box called it "a psychedelic offering with sound effects and a brilliant vocal-instrumental showing."

In 1970, in an interview with Jann Wenner of Rolling Stone magazine, John Lennon described "We Love You" as an example of a trend he perceived of the Rolling Stones copying the Beatles' style and recent songs with their material, in this case, being very similar to the sentiment the Beatles had espoused in "All You Need Is Love". He said "Every fuckin' thing we did, Mick does exactly the same – he imitates us. And I would like one of you fuckin' underground people to point it out, you know Satanic Majesties is Pepper, 'We Love You,' it's the most fuckin' bullshit, that's 'All You Need Is Love.'"

In the June 1997 issue of Mojo magazine, Jon Savage included the song in his list "Psychedelia: The 100 Greatest Classics". He also wrote: We Love You' sounded fabulous on the radio in high summer of '67 with its monster piano riff and Mellotron arabesques hanging in the air. It was only later that you noticed the heavy walking of the prison warden at the song's start or the sarcastic hostility of the lyrics." Author Stephen Davis describes the track as "sensational" and cites Jones' "panoramic Mellotron fanfare" as arguably his "last great contribution" to the Rolling Stones. Writing for AllMusic, Bill Janovitz describes Brian Jones as a "prodigy" for his musical contributions to "We Love You", while also highlighting Bill Wyman's "funky R&B bass line" and Charlie Watts' Bo Diddley-influenced drum performance as other strong elements of the recording.

In the view of sociomusicologist Simon Frith, writing in 1981, the song was symptomatic of the band's disorientation in the year that "pop" transformed to "rock". He said that the Stones' elevation to "hippie heroes", due to the drug busts, had an adverse effect on their music, since: "for a moment, Jagger and Richards' detached, selfish rock'n'roll commitment was shaken – 'We Love You' and the Satanic Majesties LP were too-obvious attempts to follow the Beatles' psychedelic trip. It wasn't until 1968, when youth politics got rougher, that the Stones made 'Jumping Jack Flash' and became a rock group, translating drug culture back into rock'n'roll terms." 

Author and critic Philip Norman dismissed "We Love You" as "a single that loses all ironic point in its feeble attempt" to copy "All You Need Is Love", adding that it was part of Jagger's ongoing "obsession" with aligning himself with the Beatles' flower power idealism and trying to match the mystical quality of the band's Sgt. Pepper's Lonely Hearts Club Band album. Writing for Mojo in 2002, music critic John Harris said in response to Norman's comments on the song: "Fortunately, nothing could be further from the facts. Its charms are legion: Nicky Hopkins' beautifully mesmeric piano, its opening chorus of sarcastic falsetto voices, mellotron passages… whose eeriness cannot help but evoke the idea of a conspiracy."

Released versions
The single was included on the UK version of Through the Past, Darkly (Big Hits Vol. 2) (1969), but was not on the US version (although the B-side "Dandelion" is present on both versions), and does not appear on the current CD version of that album. It was released, however, on some subsequent compilations: More Hot Rocks (Big Hits & Fazed Cookies) (1972), Rolled Gold: The Very Best of the Rolling Stones (1975), 30 Greatest Hits (1977), the Singles Collection: The London Years (1989), and GRRR! (50-track and 80-track editions) (2012).

Cover versions of the song were recorded by The Jazz Butcher (1990), Ryuichi Sakamoto (1991), Gregorian, and Cock Sparrer.

Personnel

According to authors Philippe Margotin and Jean-Michel Guesdon:

The Rolling Stones

Mick Jagger vocals
Keith Richards backing vocals, rhythm guitar, lead guitar
Brian Jones Mellotron
Bill Wyman bass
Charlie Watts drums

Additional musicians
Nicky Hopkins piano
John Lennon backing vocals
Paul McCartney backing vocals

Charts

References

Sources

External links
the promotional film on YouTube

The Rolling Stones songs
1967 singles
Decca Records singles
London Records singles
Songs written by Jagger–Richards
Song recordings produced by Andrew Loog Oldham
1967 songs
Psychedelic pop songs